The Image Packaging System, also known as IPS or pkg(5), is a cross-platform package management system created by the OpenSolaris community in coordination with Sun Microsystems. It is used by Solaris 11 and several illumos-based distributions: OpenIndiana, OmniOS, XStreamOS and a growing number of layered applications, including GlassFish, across a variety of OS platforms. IPS is coded in the Python programming language.

Features
Features include:
 Use of ZFS, allowing multiple boot environments and easy package operation rollbacks
 Transactional actions
 Support for multiple platform architectures within a single package
 Legacy support for SVR4 packages
 Extensive search grammar
 Remote search capability
 Changes-only based package updates
 Network package repository
 File and network-based package publication
 Package operation history
 On-disk package format (p5p)
 Multi-platform ports for layered applications:
 Broad platform support: Windows, Linux, OS X, Darwin, Solaris, OpenSolaris, illumos and AIX
 Cross-platform update notification and package management Graphical user interfaces.

Advantages 
The fact that IPS delivers each single file in a separate shelf with a separate checksum, a package update only needs to replace files that have been modified. For ELF binaries, it computes checksums only from the loaded parts of an ELF binary; this permits e.g. to avoid to update an ELF binary that changed only the ELF comment section.

Trade offs 
Due to the fact that IPS delivers each single file in a separate shelf, slow operation is caused when the input source is on a medium with high latency (e.g. internet with higher round trip time or CD/DVD media with slow seeks).

References

External links 
 Github project: Image Packaging System
 Multi-platform Packaging for Layered Distros
  GlassFish Update Center Toolkit)
  Update Center 2.0 (multiplatform IPS)

OpenSolaris
Free package management systems
Sun Microsystems software
Unix package management-related software